The Dvaravati was an ancient Mon kingdom from the 7th century to the 11th century that was located in the region now known as central Thailand. It was described by the Chinese pilgrim in the middle of the 7th century as a Buddhist kingdom named To-lo-po-ti situated to the west of Isanapura (Cambodia) and to the east of Sri Ksetra (Burma). Dvaravati also refers to a culture, an art style, and a disparate conglomeration of principalities of Mon people. Archaeological research over the past two decades or so has revealed the presence of a "Proto-Dvaravati" period which spans the 4th to 5th centuries, and perhaps earlier.

History 
The culture of Dvaravati was based around moated cities, the earliest of which appears to be U Thong in what is now Suphan Buri Province. Other key sites include Nakhon Pathom, Phong Tuk, Si Thep, Khu Bua and Si Mahosot, amongst others. Legends engraved on royal urns report the following kings: Suryavikrama (673-688), Harivikrama (688-695), Sihavikrama (695-718). A Khmer inscription dated 937 documents a line of princes of Chanasapura started by a Bhagadatta and ended by a Sundaravarman and his sons Narapatisimhavarman and Mangalavarman. But at that time, the 12th century, Dvaravati began to come under the influence of the Khmer Empire and central Southeast Asia was ultimately invaded by King Suryavarman II in the first half of the 12th century. Hariphunchai survived its southern progenitors until the late 13th century, when it was incorporated into Lan Na.

The term Dvaravati derives from coins which were inscribed in Sanskrit śrī dvāravatī. The Sanskrit word dvāravatī literally means "that which has gates".

Little is known about the administration of Dvaravati. It might simply have been a loose gathering of chiefdoms rather than a centralised state, expanding from the coastal area of the upper peninsula to the riverine region of Chao Phraya River. Hinduism and Buddhism were significant. The three largest settlements appear to have been at Nakhon Pathom, Suphanburi, Praak Srigacha, with additional centers at U Thong, Chansen, Khu Bua, Pong Tuk, Mueang Phra Rot, Lopburi, Si Mahosot, Kamphaeng Saen, Dong Lakhon, U-Taphao, Ban Khu Mueang, and Si Thep.

The traditional chronology of Dvaravati is mainly based on the Chinese textual account and stylistic comparison by art historians. However, the results from excavations in Chansen and Tha Muang mound at U-Thong raise questions about the traditional dating. Newly dated typical Dvaravati cultural items from the site of U-Thong indicate that the starting point of the tradition of Dvaravati culture may possibly date as far back to 200 CE. Archaeological, art historical, and epigraphic (inscriptions) evidence all indicate, however, that the main period of Dvaravati spanned the seventh to ninth centuries.  Dvaravati culture and influence also spread into Isan and parts of lowland Laos from the sixth century onward. Key sites include Mueang Fa Daet in Kalasin Province and Mueang Sema in Nakhon Ratchasima Province.

Art 

Dvaravati itself was heavily influenced by Indian culture, and played an important role in introducing Buddhism and particularly Buddhist art to the region. Stucco motifs on the religious monuments include garudas, makaras, and Nāgas. Additionally, groups of musicians have been portrayed with their instruments, prisoners, females with their attendants, soldiers indicative of social life. Votive tablets have also been found, also moulds for tin amulets, pottery, terracotta trays, and a bronze chandelier, earrings, bells and cymbals.

References

Further reading 

Robert L. Brown, The Dvaravati Wheels of the Law and the Indianization of South East Asia. Studies in Asian Art and Archaeology, Vol. 18, Fontein, Jan, ed. Leiden and New York: E. J. Brill, 1996.
Elizabeth Lyons, “Dvaravati, a Consideration of its Formative Period”, R. B. Smith and W. Watson (eds.), Early South East Asia: Essays in Archaeology, History and Historical Geography, Oxford University Press, New York, 1979, pp. 352–359.
Dhida Saraya, (Sri) Dvaravati: the Initial Phase of Siam's History, Bangkok, Muang Boran, 1999, 
Swearer, Donald K. and Sommai Premchit. The Legend of Queen Cama: Bodhiramsi's Camadevivamsa, a Translation and Commentary. New York: State University of New York Press, 1998. 
สุรพล ดำริห์กุล, ประวัติศาสตร์และศิลปะหริภุญไชย, กรุงเทพฯ: สำนักพิมพ์เมืองโบราณ, 2004, .
 Pierre Dupont, The Archaeology of the Mons of Dvāravatī, translated from the French with updates and additional appendices, figures and plans by Joyanto K.Sen, Bangkok, White Lotus Press, 2006.
 Jean Boisselier, “Ū-Thòng et son importance pour l'histoire de Thaïlande [et] Nouvelles données sur l'histoire ancienne de Thaïlande”, Bōrānwitthayā rư̄ang MỮang ʻŪ Thō̜ng, Bangkok, Krom Sinlapakon, 2509 [1966], pp. 161–176.
 Peter Skilling, "Dvaravati: Recent Revelations and Research", Dedications to Her Royal Highness Princess Galyani Vadhana Krom Luang Naradhiwas Rajanagarindra on her 80th birthday, Bangkok, The Siam Society, 2003, pp. 87–112.
 Natasha Eilenberg, M.C. Subhadradis Diskul, Robert L. Brown (editors), Living a Life in Accord with Dhamma: Papers in Honor of Professor Jean Boisselier on his Eightieth Birthday, Bangkok, Silpakorn University, 1997.
 C. Landes, “Pièce de l’époque romaine trouvé à U-Thong, Thaïlande”, The Silpakorn Journal, vol.26, no.1, 1982, pp. 113–115.
 John Guy, Lost Kingdoms: Hindu Buddhist Sculpture of Early Southeast, New York and Bangkok, Metropolitan Museum of Art and River Books, 2014, p. 32.
 Wārunī ʻŌsathārom.  Mư̄ang Suphan bon sēnthāng kan̄plīanplǣng thāng prawattisāt Phutthasattawat thī 8 - ton Phutthasattawat thī 25 (History, development, and geography of the ancient city of Suphan Buri Province, Central Thailand, 8th-25th B.E.), Samnakphim Mahāwitthayālai Thammasāt, Krung Thēp, 2547.

 
Former countries in Thai history
Buddhism in Thailand
Buddhist culture
Mon people
Former countries in Southeast Asia
Former monarchies of Asia
Indianized kingdoms
States and territories established in the 5th century
States and territories disestablished in 1388
1380s disestablishments in Asia
5th-century establishments in Thailand
14th-century disestablishments in Thailand
1st millennium in Thailand
Former monarchies of Southeast Asia